The 2013–14 Bangalore Super Division was the eleventh season of the Bangalore Super Division which is the third tier of the Indian football system and the top tier of the Karnataka football system. ADE won the title by managing a draw against CIL on 9 June 2014. Jawahar Union were relegated to Bangalore A Division for 2014–15 season.

Teams

Table

Fixtures and results

References

Bangalore Super Division seasons
3